Robert or Bob Bentley may refer to:
Robert Bentley (botanist) (1821–1893), English botanist
Robert Bentley (animator) (1907–2000), American animator
Robert Bentley (cricketer) (born 1958), Zimbabwean cricketer
Robert Bentley (police officer) (died 1910), British police officer
Robert J. Bentley (born 1943), retired physician, Governor of Alabama, 2011–2017
Bob Bentley (politician) (1928–2013), Canadian politician
Bobby Bentley, American high school and college football coach